The G101 class was a class of four large torpedo boats (sometimes rated as destroyers) that were ordered for the Argentine Navy from the German shipyard Germaniawerft in 1912. They were still building on the outbreak of the First World War in August 1914 when they were seized on behalf of the Kaiserliche Marine (Imperial German Navy). All four ships completed in 1915 and serving through the rest of the war, with three ships present at the Battle of Jutland in 1916. Three ships were scuttled at Scapa Flow in 1919 and one sunk as a target by American aircraft in 1921.

Design
In 1910, the Argentine Navy placed orders for twelve large destroyers with the orders split between the British shipyard Cammell Laird (four ships), the French shipyard Ateliers et Chantiers de Bretagne (four ships) and the German shipyards Germaniawerft and Schichau-Werke (two each). The four German-built ships were completed in 1912 and delivered that year, but the four British-built ships were purchased by Greece in October 1912 because of the First Balkan War, becoming the Aetos class. To replace these four ships, Argentina ordered four more ships from Germaniawerft in 1912. The outbreak of the First World War led to the four ships, which had not yet been launched, being seized by Germany on 6 August 1914 and being completed for the Kaiserliche Marine.

They displaced  normal and  full load.

The Argentines planned to arm the ships with four  guns supplied by the American Bethlehem Steel and  torpedo tubes, but they were completed with four 8.8 cm SK L/45 naval guns in four single mounts. Six  torpedo tubes were fitted, and 24 mines could be carried. These ships had a crew of 104 officers and ratings.

Ships

Service
The G102s were slower than the B97s and as a result often operated separately. While they were officially designated as torpedo boats, as the G102 class and B97 class were significantly larger than the existing torpedo craft of the German Navy, they were known as destroyers (Zerstörer) rather than torpedo boats. All four ships were present at the Battle of Jutland. Three ships of the class took part in the destruction of a convoy running between Norway and England on 11 December 1917.

All four ships of the class survived the war and were interned at Scapa Flow, along with most of the rest of the High Seas Fleet on 22 November 1918. On 21 June 1919, the German Fleet at Scapa Flow was scuttled. While G101, G103 and G104 sank, G102 ran aground during the attempt and was sunk as a target by aircraft of the US Navy in 1921.

Notes

Citations

References

Further reading
 

Torpedo boats of the Imperial German Navy
World War I torpedo boats of Germany
Ships of the Argentine Navy